Sheakhala  is a village and a gram panchayat in Chanditala I community development block in Srirampore subdivision of Hooghly district in the state of West Bengal, India. It is under Chanditala police station.

Geography

Gram panchayat
Villages in Shiakhala gram panchayat are: Chak Tajpur, Madhupur, Paschim Tajpur, Patul, Raghunathpur, Sandhipur and Sehakhala.

Demographics
As per 2011 Census of India Sehakhala had a total population of 6,434 of which 3,253 (51%) were males and 3,181 (49%) were females. Population below 6 years was 542. The total number of literates in Sehakhela was 4,955 (84.10% of the population over 6 years).

Transport

Railway
The nearest Railway station, Baruipara railway station, is on the Howrah-Bardhaman chord line, which is a part of the Kolkata Suburban Railway system. Had a Railway Station from 1915-1971 under Narrow Gauge Railway. Railway Station Board can be still seen beside SH 15 as the highway follows the same path & route of the erstwhile Martin's Light Railways Sheakhala line.

Road
State Highway 15 (Ahilyabai Holkar Road) and 31 Number Road crossing point is located in the village. 31 Number Road is the main artery of the town and it is also connected with National Highway 19 (Bora), State Highway 13 (Milki Badamtala) and State Highway 6/ G.T. Road (Nabagram).

Bus

Private Bus
 26 Bonhooghly – Champadanga
 31 Serampore - Jangipara
 26A Serampore -Aushbali
 26C Bonhooghly - Jagatballavpur
 E36 Esplanade - Champadanga

Education
 Sheakhala Benimadhab High School
 Sheakhala Benimadhab Girls High School

References

Villages in Chanditala I CD Block